Sam Valcke (born 16 December 1992) is a Belgian footballer who plays with Belgian football association FCV Dender EH as an attacking midfielder.

Club career
Valcke joined Cercle Brugge in 2014 from Londerzeel SK. He made his Belgian Pro League debut at 26 July 2014 at the opening game of the 2013/14 season against K.A.A. Gent.

References

External links
 

1992 births
Living people
Association football midfielders
Belgian footballers
Cercle Brugge K.S.V. players
Lommel S.K. players
F.C.V. Dender E.H. players
Challenger Pro League players
Belgian Pro League players